The 6th Lagos State House of Assembly is the legislative branch of the Lagos State Government inaugurated on June 4, 2007 and the assembly ran its course till July 4, 2011. The assembly was unicameral with 41 representatives elected from each constituencies of the state.
The Speaker of the 6th Legislative Assembly was Rt. Hon Adeyemi Ikuforiji and the Deputy speaker was Hon. Bola Badmus Olujobi.

Powers and duties
The legislative function of the 6th Assembly is to make law by passing bills, which must be endorsed by the two-thirds majority of the house.
Following the endorsement by the two-thirds majority, the bill is presented to the Governor, who will sign the bill to become law.
The assembly assess and approve the annual budget of the state government on presentation by the governor.
The assembly also play a significant role in the appointment of the state commissioners, chief judges and other top official by the governor, Fashola.

References

1979 establishments in Nigeria
State lower houses in Nigeria
Lagos State House of Assembly